Arlet Levandi (born 28 November 2005) is an Estonian figure skater. He is the 2022 Tallink Hotels Cup champion and a two-time Estonian national silver medalist (2021–2022). On the junior level, he is the 2022 European Youth Olympic Festival champion, the 2021 JGP France II silver medalist, the 2021 JGP Slovenia silver medalist, and a 2020 Winter Youth Olympic champion in the team event. Levandi is the first men's singles skater from Estonia to win a Junior Grand Prix medal.

Personal life 
Levandi was born on 28 November 2005, in Tallinn, Estonia to  Anna (née Kondrashova) and Allar Levandi. He has two older brothers, Anders and Armand. His mother competed in singles for the Soviet Union and is a two-time Olympian, the 1984 World silver medalist, and a four-time European bronze medalist (1984, 1986–88). His father is the 1988 Olympic bronze medalist and a 1987 World team bronze medalist in nordic combined. Levandi attends school at the Old Town Education College.

Career

Early career 
Levandi began skating in 2009. He is coached by his mother, Anna Levandi, a former Soviet figure skater, at her eponymous club in Tallinn.

Levandi is the 2017 Estonian national advanced novice bronze medalist and the 2018 Estonian national advanced novice silver medalist. Internationally on the advanced novice level, he is the 2018 Prague Riedell Ice Cup champion and a two-time Tallink Hotels Cup champion. Levandi did not compete during most of the 2018–19 season, including the 2019 Estonian Championships.

2019–2020 season 
Levandi made his junior international debut at the 2019 Halloween Cup in Budapest, where he finished fourth overall. He then earned fifth-place finishes at the Volvo Open Cup and the Tallinn Trophy before winning the bronze medal at the Golden Spin of Zagreb. Having missed the prior season, Levandi skipped the junior level entirely to compete at the senior level at the 2020 Estonian Championships. He finished fourth of four skaters behind Aleksandr Selevko, Mihhail Selevko, and Daniel Albert Naurits. However, Levandi was chosen to represent Estonia at the 2020 Winter Youth Olympics.

At the Winter Youth Olympics, Levandi was 13th in the short program after issues with his blades but improved to 11th in the free skating to finish 12th overall. For the team event, he was chosen by draw as part of Team Courage alongside ladies' singles skater Kseniia Sinitsyna of Russia, pairs team Alina Butaeva / Luka Berulava of Georgia, and ice dancers Utana Yoshida / Shingo Nishiyama of Japan. Levandi finished seventh in the men's portion of the event, and Team Courage won the gold medal overall behind Sinitsyna's and Yoshida/Nishiyama's first-place finishes in their respective segments. He reflected on the event: "I was very happy with the draw, and now we are Youth Olympic champions."

2020–2021 season 
With the COVID-19 pandemic causing the cancellation of the Junior Grand Prix series, junior skaters had limited international competitive opportunities. Levandi began the season at the Tallinn Open Championships before he competed at the inaugural Budapest Trophy, where he won gold by nearly 25 points over Slovakia's Marko Pilliar and Alp Eren Özkan of Turkey. He then won gold at the domestic Tallinn Trophy. Competing on the senior level at the 2021 Estonian Championships, Levandi was third in the short program and second in the free skating to win the silver medal behind Aleksandr Selevko and ahead of Mihhail Selevko. He finished his season with another gold at the Tallink Hotels Cup, this time ahead of Daniels Kockers of Latvia and Slovakia's Lukas Vaclavik.

2021–2022 season 
Levandi opened his season on the Junior Grand Prix, which returned after being cancelled the previous season due to the pandemic. He earned silver at the second JGP in France, becoming the first Estonian man to medal at an ISU Junior Grand Prix event. With his teammates Solène Mazingue / Marko Jevgeni Gaidajenko winning bronze in ice dance, it was Estonia's first multi-medal performance on the JGP since 2006 JGP Czech Republic. At his second JGP event in Slovenia, Levandi rebounded from sixth after the short program to finish second in the free skating and overall to win his second silver medal of the series. He did not qualify for the 2021–22 Junior Grand Prix Final due to the unique qualification procedure implemented as a result of the pandemic; he was instead third alternate. 

Levandi also made his senior international debut this season at the 2021 CS Lombardia Trophy, earning personal bests in the short program and combined total to finish seventh overall. At a second Challenger event, the 2021 CS Finlandia Trophy, he again earned all personal bests to place seventh overall. Levandi improved his short program personal best at 2021 CS Cup of Austria en route to a sixth-place finish.

Levandi won the silver medal at the Estonian Championships behind Aleksandr Selevko and ahead of Mihhail Selevko in December. The following month, he qualified to the free skate at the 2022 European Championships in his hometown of Tallinn, finishing in fourteenth place. At the Estonian Junior Championships, Levandi again won silver, this time behind Mihhail Selevko. Levandi was not selected for the Olympic or the World Championships teams but was named to the 2022 European Youth Olympic Winter Festival and the 2022 World Junior Championships teams.

Levandi returned to the junior level at the 2022 European Youth Olympic Festival, where he finished first in both segments to comfortably win gold by over 20 points ahead of Italy's Raffaele Francesco Zich and Sweden's Casper Johansson. He concluded his season at the World Junior Championships, again in front of a home crowd after Tallinn stepped out to host following problems with the original site Sofia. Levandi came in twelfth place.

2022–2023 season 
Levandi competed in several Challenger events to begin the season, finishing seventh at the 2022 CS U.S. Classic, tenth at the 2022 CS Finlandia Trophy, and fourteenth at the 2022 CS Warsaw Cup. He also appeared at the Volvo Open Cup and won a silver medal. Making his Grand Prix debut, he came seventh at the 2022 Grand Prix of Espoo.

Programs

Competitive highlights 
GP: Grand Prix; CS: Challenger Series; JGP: Junior Grand Prix

Detailed results 
ISU Personal best in bold.

Senior results

Junior results

Notes

References

External links 

 
 

2005 births
Living people
Estonian male single skaters
Figure skaters from Tallinn
Estonian people of Russian descent
Figure skaters at the 2020 Winter Youth Olympics